Lucien Laurent (10 December 1907 – 11 April 2005) was a French footballer who played as a forward. Playing for France, at the 1930 World Cup he scored the first ever FIFA World Cup goal against Mexico.

Career
Laurent was born in Saint-Maur-des-Fossés, Val-de-Marne, near Paris. He was the younger brother of Jean Laurent, who also played football and represented France and was named to the squad for the 1930 World Cup. He was also part of France's squad for the 1928 Summer Olympics, but he did not play in any matches.

Between 1921 and 1930, he played for the semi-professional team Cercle Athlétique de Paris, before being taken on by Sochaux, then a workers team for the car manufacturer Peugeot, where he was employed. As an amateur player, he only received basic compensation from the French Football Federation while at the 1930 World Cup in Uruguay.

At the Estadio Pocitos in Montevideo, Laurent made history by scoring the first ever World Cup goal: a volley in the 19th minute of a game against Mexico on 13 July 1930. France won the game 4–1, but lost their remaining group matches to Argentina and Chile, and were thus eliminated in the group stage. Laurent was ruled out of the third game due to an injury.

Laurent was named to the French squad for the 1934 World Cup, but was unable to play due to an injury. He later moved to Rennes, playing for them until 1937, then for RC Strasbourg until 1939. In all, Laurent played 10 times for France, but scored only one other goal against England in May 1931.

He joined the French armed forces during World War II, but spent three years as a prisoner of war in Saxony before being released in 1943. He played two years of wartime football for Besançon before retiring in 1946, opting to become a trainer and youth coach. He was the only surviving member of the 1930 French team to see France lift the 1998 World Cup on home soil, and died seven years later at the age of 97 in Besançon.

Honours 
 Finalist of 1928 Coupe de France with CA Paris
 Winner of the Peugeot Cup in 1931 with FC Sochaux

List of international goals scored by Lucien Laurent:
France's goal tally first

References

1907 births
2005 deaths
Sportspeople from Saint-Maur-des-Fossés
French footballers
France international footballers
FC Sochaux-Montbéliard players
FC Mulhouse players
Stade Rennais F.C. players
RC Strasbourg Alsace players
Racing Besançon players
Ligue 1 players
Olympic footballers of France
Footballers at the 1928 Summer Olympics
1930 FIFA World Cup players
1934 FIFA World Cup players
French military personnel of World War II
World War II prisoners of war held by Germany
French prisoners of war in World War II
Club Français players
Association football inside forwards
Footballers from Val-de-Marne